Chloris barbata (syn. Chloris inflata), the swollen fingergrass or purpletop chloris, is a widespread species of flowering plant in the grass family Poaceae. It is native to drier parts of the Old World tropics and sub-tropics, and it has been introduced to the southern US, most of Latin America and the Caribbean, many tropical islands, and Australia. It is considered an invasive weed species and is host to a number of serious agricultural pest species.

References

barbata
Flora of Morocco
Flora of Algeria
Flora of West Tropical Africa
Flora of Northeast Tropical Africa
Flora of East Tropical Africa
Flora of the Western Indian Ocean
Flora of the Arabian Peninsula
Flora of Iran
Flora of the Indian subcontinent
Flora of Indo-China
Flora of Southeast China
Flora of Taiwan
Flora of Peninsular Malaysia
Flora of Java
Flora of the Lesser Sunda Islands
Flora of the Philippines
Flora of New Guinea
Plants described in 1797